"No Rest for the Wicked" is a song by Swedish singer and songwriter Lykke Li from her third studio album, I Never Learn (2014). It was released as the album's lead single on 20 March 2014 through LL Recordings.

Background
"No Rest for the Wicked" was written and produced by Lykke Li and Björn Yttling for Li's third studio album, I Never Learn (2014). The singer spent two-and-a-half years writing the album in Los Angeles, California, following the end of a long-term romantic relationship. "No Rest for the Wicked", the second song she penned for the album, was written in Sweden, prior to her move to Los Angeles. Regarding the song, she told The Guardian, "I wrote it in Sweden when I was packing up my shit, and I'd just gotten out of a relationship and it was a horrible time. I just had the hurt, shame, sadness, guilt, longing." The vocal track used in the final song is a demo. Yttling played the acoustic guitar, the Moog Taurus and the zither on "No Rest for the Wicked". Erik Arvinder, Anderas Forsman, Erik Holm and Ketil Solberg played the violin, while Cecilia Linné played the cello and Anders Pettersson played the steel guitar. Mariam Wallentin provided additional vocals.

Critical reception
"No Rest for the Wicked" garnered positive reviews from music critics. Michael Cragg of The Guardian called it "vintage Lykke Li". He noted that while it is "obviously incredibly sad", it still manages to never be "morose or cloying" as "there's something almost uplifting about wallowing in [Li's] pain". Jamieson Cox of Time felt the song was a "strong preview" to I Never Learn. Alex Young of Consequence of Sound said it is not a "prototypical sad song" as the accented piano instrumentation and the "booming" chorus add "a sense of hope" in the midst of the melancholic lyrics. While reviewing I Never Learn for The Independent, Andy Gill recommended readers to  download "No Rest for the Wicked", while Sara Harowitz of Exclaim! picked it as a standout on the album, complementing its drum beats. musicOMH writer John Murphy likened it to Li's previous singles "I Follow Rivers" and "Sadness Is a Blessing", labeling it a "future classic". Drowned in Sound's Tom Fenwick named it a "truly captivating single".

Remix
A remixed version of "No Rest for the Wicked", featuring American rapper ASAP Rocky, premiered exclusively on Beats Music on 21 April 2014. The remix was later made available for download on digital retailers on 28 April 2014. While the instrumentation and Li's vocals are untouched, the remix adds a "thumping" bass line and a rap verse by ASAP Rocky. Corinne Cummings of Rolling Stone rated the remix three stars out of five, writing, "The combination doesn't always exceed the sum of its parts, but Sad Rocky's lyrics – 'If love don't work, it just gon' hurt/It all goes bad, it just get worse' – have their charms." John Surico Spin commented that "So as unlikely as the Swedish singer's recruitment of ASAP Rocky for a remix may look on paper, the team-up actually makes some solid sense."

Music video
The music video for "No Rest for the Wicked" was directed by Tarik Saleh and released on 10 April 2014.

Track listings
Digital download
"No Rest for the Wicked" – 3:43
E-Dubble - no rest for the wicked
Digital EP – Remixes
"No Rest for the Wicked" (featuring ASAP Rocky) – 3:03
"No Rest for the Wicked" (Klangkarussell remix) – 3:37
"No Rest for the Wicked" (Joris Voorn remix) – 6:06
"No Rest for the Wicked" (Ten Ven remix) – 6:19

Remix download
"No Rest for the Wicked" (featuring ASAP Rocky) – 3:03

Credits and personnel

Lykke Li – production, songwriting, lead vocals
Björn Yttling – production, songwriting, acoustic guitar, Taurus, zither
Anders Pettersson – steel guitar
Mariam Wallentin – additional vocals
Andreas Forsman – violin

Ketil Solberg – violin
Erik Arvinder – violin
Erik Holm – violin
Cecilia Linné – cello

Credits are adapted from the "No Rest for the Wicked" liner notes.

Charts

References

External links
 

2014 singles
2014 songs
Atlantic Records singles
Lykke Li songs
Songs written by Björn Yttling
Songs written by Lykke Li